Bamanophis is a genus of snake in the family Colubridae. The genus contains the sole species Bamanophis dorri, which is native to West Africa.

Etymology
The specific name, dorri,  is in honor of French military officer Emile Dorr (1857–1907), who collected the holotype.

Geographic range
B. dorri is found in northern Benin, Burkina Faso, northern Ghana, Guinea, Mali, Mauritania, Senegal, and northern Togo.

Habitat
The preferred natural habitat of B. dorri is rocky areas in savanna.

Description
Dorsally, B. dorri is gray or reddish, with a series of X-shaped dark spots. Ventrally, it is yellowish white.

Reproduction
B. dorri is oviparous.

References

Further reading
Boulenger GA (1893). Catalogue of the Snakes in the British Museum (Natural History). Volume I., Containing the Families ... Colubridæ Aglyphæ, part. London: Trustees of the British Museum (Natural History). (Taylor and Francis, printers). xiii + 448 pp. + Plates I–XXVIII. (Zamenis dorri, pp. 410–411.
Lataste F (1888). "Description d'un ophidien diacrantérien nouveau ( Periops dorri, n. sp.) Originaire du Haut-Sénégal ". Le Naturaliste, Deuxième Série 10: 227–228. (Periops dorri, new species). (in French).
Schätti B, Trape J-F (2008). "Bamanophis, a new genus for the West African colubrid Periops dorri Lataste, 1888 (Reptilia: Squamata: Colubrinae)". Revue Suisse de Zoologie 115 (4): 595–615.  

Colubrids
Monotypic snake genera